John Hayter   (21 October 1800 – 3 June 1895) was an English portrait painter who was Painter-in-Ordinary to Queen Victoria, whom he first painted when she was 12 years old.

Biography
He was the second son of the miniaturist Charles Hayter and brother of Sir George Hayter, also a portraitist. He entered the Royal Academy schools in 1815, and began to exhibit at the Royal Academy in the same year. He also exhibited work at the British Institution and the Royal Society of British Artists. Hayter established himself during the 1820s, with portraits of notable figures such as the Duke of Wellington and the opera singer, Giuditta Pasta. His portrait drawings, in chalks or crayons, became particularly popular, a number of them being engraved for The Court Album, which contained portraits of the female aristocracy (1850–57).

Gallery

Bibliography 
Drawings by Sir George and John Hayter (exh. cat. by B. Coffey [Bryant], London, Morton Morris, 1982) [incl. checklist of prints]

See also
 List of British painters

References

External links
 
 , engraved by James Thomson for Fisher's Drawing Room Scrap Book, 1839, with a poetical illustration by Letitia Elizabeth Landon.

1800 births
1895 deaths
19th-century English painters
English male painters
English portrait painters
People from Marylebone
Royal Academicians
Court painters
19th-century English male artists